MotorCity Casino Hotel is a casino and hotel in Detroit, Michigan, United States. It opened December 1999 and is one of three casino hotels in the city. There are four hotels in the Detroit–Windsor area, including the Ontario-owned Caesars Windsor.

The $825 million MotorCity complex has a historic building that housed the Wagner Baking Company, makers of the brand Wonder Bread. The complex houses a 100,000 square-foot casino with approximately 2,800 slot machines, 59 table games, and two poker rooms; a 13,000-square-foot spa; 67,000 square feet of meeting and convention space; Sound Board, a live music theater with a capacity of 2,400 people; and a luxury hotel with 400 guest rooms and suites.

Opened by Mandalay Resort Group, MotorCity Casino Hotel was later purchased by Marian Ilitch of IH Gaming (Detroit Entertainment, LLC).

Architecture
The building, located on Grand River Avenue at the Lodge Freeway (M-10), was designed by architect Walter W. Ahlschlager. As part of the property's renovation as a casino, the terracotta elements of the former bread bakery were restored to their original condition, preserving the signature features of the building.

Chip Foose, a custom car designer and television personality, was a member of the design team. He is credited as instrumental in the property's look. Foose's influence is reflected strongly in the sweeping roof design, a 304-foot-long stainless steel undulating ribbon produced by Quality Metalcraft Inc., under the direction of Michael Chetcuti. It is considered a reference to Detroit's automotive history. Foose says it was inspired by the door molding on a 1957 Chevrolet Bel Air. The roof ranges in height from 3.5 feet to 10 feet and weighs over 181 tons.

Casino
The casino features more than 100,000 square feet of gaming space. It includes approximately 2,800 slot machines (160 of them located in smoke-free gaming areas); approximately 59 table games; and two poker rooms.

The interior of the casino is notable for Foose's design of the ceiling, which features large, extruded aluminum-like beams and thousands of multi-color LEDs that can display video with more than 256,000 colors. The style is referred to as "Future Retro," and the ceiling resembles a giant custom car radiator. 

Other elements of design referring to Detroit's automotive heritage include hot rod flame carpeting. The entrances to the smoke-free slot room resemble the front-end grilles of a 1938 Buick Century and a 1939 Lincoln-Zephyr. 

In a nod to Detroit's Motown and other musical roots, the pillars of the Amnesia event space are designed to resemble bass clefs. The five-bar musical staff is used as a design element on items ranging from slot machine bases to signage throughout the property. Zebrawood, a wood often used in guitar construction, is incorporated into the hotel lobby and guestrooms.

Sound Board
With a capacity of 2,400, Sound Board is a performance venue, and Detroit's only casino theater. Since opening with a concert by Detroit native Anita Baker on October 23, 2008, Sound Board has hosted entertainment and musical performers. The theater also hosts events such as live boxing and major product launches.

The sound, lighting, and video equipment includes a d&b Line Array Sound System with Yamaha PM7 Rivage audio consoles, an HES Road Hog Full Boar lighting console, more than 50 moving lights and DL-3 lighting fixtures.

Hotel
Opened in November 2007, the MotorCity Casino Hotel has 400 rooms and suites.

Dining
MotorCity offers a variety of dining options:

Events and conventions
MotorCity has 67,000 square feet of conference and banquet space.

Photo gallery

See also

Caesars Windsor
Hollywood Casino at Greektown
MGM Grand Detroit
List of casinos in Michigan
 Wikimedia graph of Detroit's casino revenues

References

1999 establishments in Michigan
2007 establishments in Michigan
Commercial buildings in Detroit
Casinos in Michigan
Resorts in Michigan
Performing arts centers in Michigan
Skyscraper hotels in Detroit
Economy of Detroit
Tourist attractions in Detroit
Casino hotels
Mandalay Resort Group
Casinos completed in 1999
Hotel buildings completed in 2007